The 1974–75 Hellenic Football League season was the 22nd in the history of the Hellenic Football League, a football competition in England.
It was also the first season in which the Hellenic League used three points for a win.

Premier Division

The Premier Division featured 13 clubs which competed in the division last season, along with four new clubs, promoted from Division One:
Cirencester Town
Newbury Town
Oxford City reserves
Rivet Sports

Also, Thatcham changed name to Thatcham Town.

League table

Division One

The Division One featured 11 clubs which competed in the division last season, along with 3 new clubs:
Fairford Town, relegated from the Premier Division
Pressed Steel, relegated from the Premier Division
Hazells, relegated from the Premier Division

League table

References

External links
 Hellenic Football League

1974-75
H